Partulina ustulata is a species of tropical air-breathing land snail, a terrestrial pulmonate gastropod mollusk in the family Achatinellidae. This species is endemic to Hawaii in the United States.

References

Partulina
Molluscs of Hawaii
Gastropods described in 1856
Taxonomy articles created by Polbot